Adrian Chafer (born July 4, 1991 in Madrid, Spain), is a Spanish singer, songwriter and producer.

Career 
Chafer started uploading covers to YouTube in 2010. In 2014 he participated in the contest "La Voz España", finishing as a finalist. That same year, he recorded his first album, set to be released in 2015.

Before releasing his first album, he was also a collaborator of Radio Libertad FM of Madrid.

Chafer's first album was called "Lazy" and the first single that released was titled the same. Lazy reached the top 10 in the lists of Spotify at national level. The album was released in 2015.

He has been nominated for "disc of the year" at the Onda Awards in Spain and "Revalación Artist" at the EDM RADIO Awards.

Featured singles

References

Links 
 Adrian Chafer interview at SantoGrial (2015) http://www.santogrialproducciones.es/web/index.php?menu=3&pagina=contacto&item=332
 ADRIÁN CHAFER: "in" LAZY "you will find many Truths about everythings of feelings i have had " https://thecultureta.wordpress.com/2015/05/25/adrian-chafer-en-lazy-encontrareis-muchas-verdades-sobre-todo-de-sentimientos-que-he-tenido/
 Adrian Chafer. The most Spanish and international pop of 2015. http://noeliabaldrich.blogspot.com.es/2015/03/chaferlazy-es-un-disco-muy-autentico-y.html
 The versatile Adrian Chafer releases the first album. http://www.diariocritico.com/noticia/479973/musica/el-polifacetico-adrian-chafer-nos-subyuga-con-lazy-su-primer-disco-y-la-banda-sonora-de-su-vida.html
 Adrian Chafer: "I would like to work with alejandro sanz, he is my idol". https://web.archive.org/web/20170423154713/http://www.lhmagazin.com/lh-en-el-heroe-entrevista-a-adrian-chafer/
 Adrian Chafer: "If you do not dedicate to music I would not dedicate myself to anything" http://www.radiostarterrassa.com/news.php?item.2849
 Adrian Chafer: "I sing in English because that's how I feel." http://www.esmiradio.es/adrian-chafer-el-jueves-26-de-marzo-de-2015-en-esmiradio-es/
 Adrian Chafer versiona "Together" with Corina Randazzo in the video clip. http://cadenaser.com/emisora/2015/05/21/radio_murcia/1432210260_611621.html
 Adrian Chafer winner of Premios Ondas 2015 presents "Together".http://www.rtve.es/alacarta/videos/para-todos-la-2/para-todos-2-actuacion-adrian-chafer-together/3083795/

Official Links 
 Official Website

Living people
1991 births
People from Madrid
21st-century Spanish singers
21st-century Spanish male singers